Symptoms + Cures is the fourth studio album by Canadian hardcore punk band Comeback Kid. It was released on August 31, 2010. It's the band's first album released through Distort Entertainment after their previous record label Smallman Records went out of business. It's also distributed in the US through Victory Records. Symptoms + Cures was recorded with Eric Ratz and Kenny Luong, both of which have previously worked with the Canadian punk bands Cancer Bats and Billy Talent.

The release is the second studio album to feature Andrew Neufeld as a vocalist after the 2007 album, Broadcasting.... Neufeld previously played guitar for Comeback Kid and only began to sing for the band after the former vocalist Scott Wade left in 2006. Drummer Kyle Profeta commented on Comeback Kid's second album working with Neufeld as a vocalist, "we have really found our sound with him and we are all really excited about it."

Track listing
Source: Distort Entertainment

Personnel

Comeback Kid
 Jeremy Hiebert – guitar
 Andrew Neufeld – vocals
 Kyle Profeta – drums
 Casey Hjelmberg – guitar
 Matt Keil – bass

Guest musicians
 Nuno Pereira (A Wilhelm Scream) – vocals on "The Concept Stays"
 Liam Cormier (Cancer Bats) – vocals on "Balance"
 Sam Carter (Architects) – vocals on "Pull Back the Reins"

Artwork and design
 Michael Bukowski – illustrations
 Jason Link – design, layout
 Scott Wade – logo
 Eric Levin – photography

Production and recording
 Eric Ratz – production, engineering, mixing
 Kenny Luong – production, engineering, mixing
 Comeback Kid – production, engineering
 Jeff Crake – assisted engineering
 Chris Snow – assisted engineering
 Scott Lake – mastering
 Alan Riches – guitar technician, drum technician
 Greg Below – additional engineering
 Craig Pattison – additional technical support
 Nicole Hughes – additional technical support
 Gavin Brown – additional technical support
 Marcio Sargento – additional technical support
 Michael T. Fox – additional technical support
 Steve Evetts – engineering (Sam Carter's vocals)
 Clint Billington - A&R
 Tony Brummel - A&R

References

External links
Comeback Kid on Myspace

2010 albums
Victory Records albums
Distort Entertainment albums
Comeback Kid albums